Henry Joseph Thielman (October 3, 1880 – September 2, 1942) was a pitcher in Major League Baseball. He was born in St. Cloud, Minnesota and played baseball for local teams. He also attended the University of Notre Dame in 1900–1901 and played football there.

Thielman started his professional career in 1902 with the New York Giants. After being released in May, he finished out the season with the Cincinnati Reds, going 9-15 with a 3.24 earned run average.

Thielman was then purchased by the Brooklyn Superbas. He started out 1903 by losing his first three decisions, and he never pitched in the majors again. Thielman pitched for the Eastern League's Jersey City Skeeters from 1903–1906. After being released by Brooklyn, he went 23-5 for the Skeeters the rest of the season and led the EL in winning percentage. Jersey City cruised to the league championship.

Thielman didn't play much after 1903, and he soon retired to become a dentist. He practiced dentistry in New York City.

Thielman's older brother, Jake Thielman, also pitched in the majors.

References

External links

1880 births
1942 deaths
Major League Baseball pitchers
Brooklyn Superbas players
Cincinnati Reds players
New York Giants (NL) players
Jersey City Skeeters players
Baseball players from Minnesota
Portland Beavers players
Manhattan Jaspers baseball players
Notre Dame Fighting Irish baseball players
Plattsburgh (baseball) players